Mê Linh may refer to several places in Vietnam, including:

 Mê Linh District, a rural district of Hanoi
 Mê Linh, Hanoi, a rural commune of Mê Linh District
 Mê Linh, Lâm Đồng, a rural commune of Lâm Hà District
 Mê Linh, Thái Bình, a rural commune of Đông Hưng District